The Church of Jesus Christ of Latter-day Saints in Oklahoma refers to the Church of Jesus Christ of Latter-day Saints (LDS Church) and its members in Oklahoma. Official church membership as a percentage of general population was 1.20% in 2014. According to the 2014 Pew Forum on Religion & Public Life survey, 1% of Oklahomans self-identify themselves most closely with The Church of Jesus Christ of Latter-day Saints. The LDS Church is the 8th largest denomination in Oklahoma.

The history of the denomination in what would become Oklahoma begins in the 1840s and the Indian Territory Mission was created and placed under the leadership of George Miller in 1855. The first temple in Oklahoma was dedicated in 2000. The nine stakes based in Oklahoma are located in Bartlesville, Lawton, Norman, Oklahoma City, Edmond, Oklahoma, Stillwater and Tulsa.

History

In the late 1840s, George Miller, a former bishop who delayed going to the West, traveled from Winter Quarters to visit his son in Texas. He and two other members with him, Joseph Kilting and Richard Hewitt, found construction work available in the Cherokee Nation. They arrived in Tahlequah on July 9, 1847, and began to build houses. They also began to teach others about the Mormon faith, but antagonism forced Miller to leave in December. Hewitt and Kilting remained to work.

In 1855, Orson Spencer and James McGaw visited the Indian Territory from St. Louis, Missouri, and on April 8, five more missionaries were sent from Salt Lake City, and four from St. Louis. The Indian Territory Mission was created and placed under the leadership of Miller on June 26, 1855.

The missionaries met and reconverted followers of Lyman Wight. One of these was Jacob Croft who had met missionaries earlier and started for Utah. After hearing misconceptions about conditions there, his party settled in Indian Territory and built a gristmill.

As early as July 1855, missionaries preached to about 400 Indians, and the Cherokee Branch was started at Croft's Spavinaw Creek mill.  This became Mission headquarters. Croft later lead a party of 56 including other former followers of Wight and some re-converted "Strangites" to Utah. Later in the year, missionaries were sent from St. Louis to southern portions of the Cherokee Nations. In 1856, the Princess Creek branch was organized. The Lehi and Nephi branches were organized in 1858. Illness was a problem in the Indian Territory Mission for many years. At least four missionaries died including Orson Spencer.

The Remaining Members Migrated to Utah in 1858 and 1859. By 1860, the missionaries save John A. Richards, who had married an Indian wife, returned to Utah and the mission was discontinued.

When Matthew Dalton and John Hubbard returned to begin missionary work in 1877, they found Richards was still faithful, and they received assistance from him. Later that year, Elder Hubbard died and the mission was closed. In 1883, Matthew Dalton and Elder George Teasdale of the Quorum of the Twelve reorganized the mission. Tracts in the Cherokee language were printed.

Andrew Kimball, father of President Spencer W. Kimball, presided over the mission in 1885. Although he had contracted malaria, he carried on the work and was assisted by John Richards, and later by additional full-time missionaries. In 1892, the first meetinghouse was built in Manard (Cherokee County). Another was built in Massey (Choctaw Nation).

On November 7, 1911, a branch was established at Gore with 113 members but was later dissolved. It was not until May 1, 1960, when the branch was again organized in Gore. A Sunday school that began in Bartlesville in 1924 became a branch on October 13, 1945. Membership increased slowly as many converts moved to Utah. Membership increased in the 1950s and 1960s. Two stakes were created in 1960. The Tulsa Stake was created on May 1, 1960, and the Oklahoma City Stake on October 23, 1960.

The Latter-day Saint community reached out to those in need after a bomb destroyed the nine-story Alfred P. Murrah Federal Building in downtown Oklahoma City on April 19, 1995.

In 1999, thousands of Latter-day Saints volunteers from Oklahoma and surrounding areas came to Oklahoma in response to the 1999 Oklahoma tornado outbreak to provide rescue, relief, and recovery for the victims of the storm.
Latter-day Saints in Oklahoma provided relief to victims of other disasters including floods in 2007, the Mid-May 2008 tornado outbreak sequence, and provided aid to victims of Hurricane Katrina.

On October 17, 2021, the LDS Church donated $2 million to the First Americans Museum in Oklahoma City.  The donation is intended to assist Native Americans in learning about their ancestral past.

Stakes
There are nine stakes with their stake center located in Oklahoma. All nine of these stakes are located in the Oklahoma City Temple District and the Oklahoma Oklahoma City Mission.  Six other stakes have congregations in Oklahoma.

As of February 2023, the following Stakes had Stake Centers in Oklahoma:

 *Stakes with stake centers located outside the state.

Missions
On March 29, 1898, Oklahoma became part of the Southwestern States Mission, and it was included in the Central States Mission on April 4, 1904. The Oklahoma Mission was created on June 10, 1970, renamed the Oklahoma Tulsa Mission in 1974. The Oklahoma Oklahoma City Mission was created in 1990.

In 2015, at the request of President Scott K. Shumway, the Oklahoma Tulsa Mission headquarters were relocated to Bentonville, Arkansas, which was geographically located in the center of the mission boundaries. In June 2015, business was presented in the units across the mission boundaries sustaining the official name change to the Arkansas Bentonville Mission.

In December 2016, the Tulsa, Tulsa East, and Bartlesville Stakes were transferred from the Arkansas Bentonville Mission to the Oklahoma Oklahoma City Mission. With this change, all 8 stakes in the state of Oklahoma were within the same mission boundaries.

Temples

The Oklahoma City Oklahoma Temple was dedicated on July 30, 2000, by President James E. Faust of the First Presidency. The temple was closed for more than two years for an extensive renovation and was rededicated on May 19, 2019, by President Henry B. Eyring. An open house was held for the public before the dedication and guests included 20 state legislators.

On October 5, 2019, during the church's general conference, church president Russell M. Nelson announced plans to construct the Bentonville Arkansas Temple. This temple will likely include congregations in Northeast Oklahoma as part of its district.

See also

The Church of Jesus Christ of Latter-day Saints membership statistics (United States)
Oklahoma: Religion

References

External links
 The Church of Jesus Christ of Latter-day Saints in Oklahoma Newsroom site
 ComeUntoChrist.org Latter-day Saints Visitor site
 The Church of Jesus Christ of Latter-day Saints Official site

Latter Day Saint movement in Oklahoma
Oklahoma